Enrique de Aragón y Pimentel, known as el Infante Fortuna (Calatayud, 25 July 1445 – Castelló d'Empúries, 2 July 1522), was Count of Ampurias becoming Count later 1st Duke of Segorbe.
He served as Viceroy of Catalonia between 1479 and 1493.

Life 
The only and posthumous son of Henry, Duke of Villena and his second wife Beatriz de Pimentel, he succeeded his father as Count of Empúries and Count of Segorbe, when his uncle Alfonso V of Aragon , who had served as Regent, died in 1458. In 1469 his countship of Segorbe was elevated to a dukedom.

Upon his cousin's accession to throne of Aragon in 1479, King Ferdinand II of Aragon appointed him as Viceroy of Catalonia.
The Duke of Segorbe died on 2 July 1522 at Castelló d'Empúries and is buried in the Poblet Monastery.

Marriage and Children 

In 1488, Enrique de Aragón married Guiomar de Portugal (died 1516), sister of Fadrique de Portugal, Privy Counsellor to Ferdinand II of Aragon. 
They had 3 children :

 Juan de Aragón (1488–1490).
 Alfonso de Aragón y Portugal (1489–1562), Viceroy of Valencia.
 Isabel de Aragón (1491–1530), married in 1513 Íñigo López de Mendoza, 4th Duke of the Infantado.

See also 
 House of Trastámara

Sources 
 Gran enciclopèdia catalana
 www.censoarchivos.mcu.es

1522 deaths
1445 births
Dukes of Spain
Viceroys of Catalonia
Enrique